Russell Gewirtz (born 1967 in Great Neck, New York) is an American screenwriter, best known for writing the screenplay for Spike Lee's 2006 film Inside Man.

Life and career 
Gewirtz attended Trinity School in New York City before earning a degree in computer science from Tufts University. He then attended Benjamin N. Cardozo School of Law in Manhattan, and because "one law degree wasn't enough," he earned an LL.M. in Taxation from the NYU School of Law. 
"I don't carry a business card. But if I did, it would say Esq., B.A., J.D., LL.M. after my name."
After passing the bar exam, Gewirtz went to work for his father running a small chain of clothing stores. After brokering a lucrative real estate deal in 1999, he left New York for several years and spent time in France and Brazil. It was at the 2001 Cannes Film Festival that he originally pitched the idea for Inside Man to Daniel Rosenberg and became a Hollywood screenwriter.

He wrote two episodes for TV series Blind Justice in 2005, after penning Inside Man.

Gewirtz's second screenplay was Righteous Kill, a thriller starring Al Pacino and Robert De Niro, which received mainly negative reviews. and grossed $78.4 million. While he was resolute that the script he penned was every bit as good as Inside Man, if not better, Gewirtz blamed director Jon Avnet for the film's failure. "Not only was he arrogant and misguided in his faith in his storytelling ability, but he somehow believed that he could rewrite the script and give his mistress a leading role, without damaging morale of the cast and crew, or the finished product. Sadly, he was grossly mistaken."

Filmography

Films
 Inside Man (2006)
 Righteous Kill (2008)

Television
 Blind Justice (2005)

References

External links

American male screenwriters
Trinity School (New York City) alumni
Tufts University alumni
Living people
1967 births
Screenwriters from New York (state)